David Sweet (born 1957) is a Canadian politician.

David Sweet may also refer to:
David E. Sweet (1933–1984), American academic
David W. Sweet (born 1948), American politician and lawyer